The Barry Sisters were an American vocal duo active from the 1950s–1970s

The Barry Sisters may also refer to:
 The Three Barry Sisters (active 1959–1960), an English trio that recorded two commissions of John Barry
 The Barry Sisters (active 1961), an Australian backing group to The Allen Brothers